101 Battalion (pronounced as one-o-one Battalion) was a quick-reaction unit of the South West African Territorial Force, composed of black and white commissioned and enlisted personnel.

History

Origin
The unit was formed in January 1976 as 1 Owambo Battalion, renamed to 35 Battalion in January 1978, 35 Battalion recruited exclusively among the Owambo. and were only given basic training, but this changed after 1978 when the training intensified with an emphasis on rural counterinsurgency operations.

Renaming
The South West Africa Territory Force, SWATF renumbered battalion numbers according to their geographical positioning on the border. The prefix 10 pertained to battalions operating to the west of the Kavango River, 20 to the Kavango or central region and 70 to the eastern region. Under this system, 35 Battalion was renamed 101 Battalion in 1980.

Tracking
Until 1980 101 battalion was used as small teams attached to SADF units as trackers and interpreters.

Light Infantry
By 1981 101 converted to a light infantry battalion.

By 1983 at least 2700 men had been recruited and trained, many converted SWAPO insurgents.

Introduction of the Romeo Mike Concept
A significant development in 101's operations occurred during 1982 with the adaption of Koevoet tactics to a military context. The Reaction Force concept or Romeo Mike developed into two Special Service Companies (901 and 903) in 1984 and a further two (902 and 904) by 1985. Their purpose was to relentlessly track and surround exhausted insurgents. Once a track was detected, elements of  a team would dismount from a Casspir and follow the track at a run with the remainder of the team rested and following in the Casspir, and swapping over with the runners frequently, thus sustaining a fast pursuit of the insurgents. When contact was made, the full team with Casspir would charge in. The Romeo Mikes's other three Casspirs would be close  of each other and would also react.

Structure
101 Battalion consisted of:
 a HQ,
 a support company,
 a light workshop,
 a training wing,
 Special service companies, translating Police tracking concepts to suit Army operations:
 901 and
 903 Special Service Companies.

These Companies concentrated on external operations and pursuit of infiltrators. Another two reaction force companies was activated, and
 a Reconnaissance Wing.

Equipment
Each team in a company had:
 4 X Casspirs
 1 X Kwêvoël 50
 2 X Hispano Suiza 20mm cannons,
 6 X 50 cal Browning machine guns
 4 X Light machine guns and
 4 X 60mm patrol mortars

Engagements
101 Battalions reaction force teams averaged about 200 contacts annually.
By 1985 101 Battalion fought under its own command instead of being detached to external units.

Disbandment
101 Battalion was disbanded on 30 June 1989 upon the independence of Namibia in 1990-91.

101 Battalion's Colours and Standard were finally laid up in the unit church of 5 Reconnaissance Regiment on 10 April 1990.

Leadership

Decorations awarded to 101 Battalion members

Rifleman D. Hashihamwenda Honoris Crux Silver
Lieutenant N. Prinsloo Honoris Crux
2 Lieutenant D. Bok Honoris Crux
Corporal J.J. Bronkhorst Honoris Crux
Corporal T. Stander Honoris Crux
Corporal J. Theunissen Honoris Crux
Corporal F. Frederick Honoris Crux
Corporal J.H Steenkamp Honoris Crux
L Corporal Roux Honoris Crux
Rifleman Schoombee Honoris Crux

Roll of Honour

Notes

See also
 South African Border War

References

Further reading
Helmoed-Romer Heitman (Author), Paul Hannon (Illustrator), Modern African Wars (3): South-West Africa (Men-At-Arms Series, 242),  Osprey Publishing (November 28, 1991) .

South West Africa Territorial Force
Military units and formations of the Cold War
Military units and formations of South Africa
Military units and formations of South Africa in the Border War
Military units and formations established in 1976
Military units and formations disestablished in 1991